K2-66b is a confirmed mega-Earth orbiting the subgiant K2-66, about  form Earth in the direction of Aquarius. It is an extremely hot and dense planet heavier than Neptune, but with only about half its radius.

Planet properties

Mass, radius, and temperature 
K2-66b is a mega-Earth with radius  and mass .

Orbit 
The planet orbits every 5.07 days at 0.06 AU. It orbits within a "photoevaporation desert", where orbiting exoplanets should be very uncommon. K2-66b's orbit is nearly circular.

Star 
The star, K2-66 is a G1 sub-giant in Aquarius. It has a sun-like temperature of 5887 K, which corresponds to its spectral class and is very close to that of the rotationally variable star Kepler-130. Its metallicity is −0.047, and its apparent magnitude is 11.71.

See also 

 Kepler
 Mega-Earth
 K2-56b
Sub-giant
G-type main sequence star
Density 
List of exoplanets discovered in 2017 
List of exoplanets discovered in 2016 
Lava planet 
Stellar evolution

References

External links 

 Kepler-130
SIMBAD: Kepler-130

Exoplanets discovered in 2016
Mega-Earths
Aquarius (constellation)
Transiting exoplanets
Exoplanets discovered by K2